Thomas Wilson Meade  (21 January 1936 – 24 October 2022) was a British epidemiologist. He was a pioneer in epidemiology—in particular, in the role blood clotting factors have in cardiovascular disease. 

Meade underwent medical training at Christ Church, Oxford, and afterwards at St Bartholomew's Hospital, qualifying in 1960.

In 1970, after a period studying at the Schieffelin Leprosy Research Sanatorium in South India, he became Director of the Medical Research Council's Epidemiology and Medical Care Unit. He retired from there in 2001, and became Emeritus Professor of Epidemiology at the London School of Hygiene & Tropical Medicine, investigating cardiovascular disease.

Meade held Honorary Consultant positions in Epidemiology at St Bartholomew's, and at Northwick Park Hospital.

Meade was made a Commander of the Order of the British Empire (CBE) in the 1994 Birthday Honours "For services to Medicine and to Science", elected a Fellow of the Royal Society in 1996 and received the Balzan Prize for epidemiology in 1997.

Tom Meade was a Quaker, attending Hampstead Friends Meeting. He had a son and two daughters, and eight grandchildren. Meade's son, Sir Richard Meade, was appointed a High Court judge in 2020. One of his daughters runs the Railway Land Wildlife Trust in Lewes, Sussex, the other is a NHS medical doctor in London.

Meade died on 24 October 2022, at the age of 86.

References

External links 
 

1936 births
2022 deaths
Place of birth missing
British public health doctors
Fellows of the Royal Society
Alumni of Christ Church, Oxford
Alumni of the Medical College of St Bartholomew's Hospital
Fellows of the Royal College of Physicians
Medical Research Council (United Kingdom) people
Commanders of the Order of the British Empire